Ramsi is a small borough in Viljandi Parish, Viljandi County, Estonia. As of 2011 Census, the settlement's population was 633.

References

Boroughs and small boroughs in Estonia
Populated places in Viljandi County
Viljandi Parish
Kreis Fellin